The 2017 Lilly Diabetes 250 was the 18th stock car race of the 2017 NASCAR Xfinity Series season and the sixth iteration of the event. The race was held on Saturday, July 22, 2017, in Speedway, Indiana, at Indianapolis Motor Speedway a 2.500 miles (4.023 km) permanent, rectangular-shaped, low-banked racetrack. The race took the scheduled 100 laps to complete. In an exciting battle with 5 laps to go, William Byron, driving for JR Motorsports, held off a charging Paul Menard for his third career NASCAR Xfinity Series win. To fill out the podium, Joey Logano of Team Penske would finish third, respectively.

Background 

The race was held at Indianapolis Motor Speedway, which is an automobile racing circuit located in Speedway, Indiana (an enclave suburb of Indianapolis) in the United States. It is the home of the Indianapolis 500 and the Verizon 200, and formerly the home of the United States Grand Prix.

Constructed in 1909, it is the second purpose-built, banked oval racing circuit after Brooklands and the first to be called a 'speedway'. It is the third-oldest permanent automobile race track in the world, behind Brooklands and the Milwaukee Mile. With a permanent seating capacity of 257,325, it is the highest-capacity sports venue in the world.

Entry list 

 (R) denotes rookie driver.
 (i) denotes driver who is ineligible for series driver points.

Practice

First practice 
The first practice session was held on Friday, July 21, at 1:00 PM EST. The session would last for 55 minutes.

Final practice 
The final practice session was held on Friday, July 21, at 3:00 PM EST. The session would last for 55 minutes.

Qualifying 
Qualifying was held on Saturday, July 22, at 12:45 PM EST. Since Indianapolis Motor Speedway is at least , the qualifying system was a single car, single lap, two round system where in the first round, everyone would set a time to determine positions 13–40. Then, the fastest 12 qualifiers would move on to the second round to determine positions 1–12.

Full qualifying results

Race results 
Stage 1 Laps: 30

Stage 2 Laps: 30

Stage 3 Laps: 40

Standings after the race 

Drivers' Championship standings

Note: Only the first 12 positions are included for the driver standings.

References 

2017 NASCAR Xfinity Series
NASCAR races at New Hampshire Motor Speedway
July 2017 sports events in the United States
2017 in sports in New Hampshire